George H. Parks House is a historic home located at Glens Falls, Warren County, New York.  It was built about 1900 and is a three-story, substantial, asymmetrical Queen Anne style residence covered by a slate hipped roof.  It features a first story wraparound porch and porte cochere.  It also features a massive cylindrical tower surmounted by a bell-cast slate roof.

It was added to the National Register of Historic Places in 1984.

References

Houses on the National Register of Historic Places in New York (state)
Queen Anne architecture in New York (state)
Houses completed in 1900
Houses in Warren County, New York
National Register of Historic Places in Warren County, New York